TIROS-9 (also called TIROS-I or A-54) was a spin-stabilized meteorological satellite. It was the ninth in a series of Television Infrared Observation Satellites.

Launch 
TIROS-9 was launched on January 22, 1965, by a Thor-Delta rocket from Cape Canaveral Air Force Station, Florida. The spacecraft functioned nominally until February 15, 1967. The satellite orbited the Earth once every 2 hours, at an inclination of 96°.

Mission
TIROS-9 was a spin-stabilized meteorological spacecraft designed to test experimental television techniques and infrared equipment. The satellite was in the form of an 18-sided right prism, 107 cm in diameter and 56 cm high. The top and sides of the spacecraft were covered with approximately 9000 1-by 2-cm silicon solar cells. It was equipped with 2 independent television camera subsystems for taking cloudcover pictures, plus an omnidirectional radiometer and a five-channel scanning radiometer for measuring radiation from the earth and its atmosphere. The satellite spin rate was maintained between 8 and 12 rpm by use of five diametrically opposed pairs of small, solid-fuel thrusters.

The TV system operated normally until April 1, 1965, when one of the wide-angle TV cameras failed. The other camera operated normally until July 26, 1965, and sporadically until February 15, 1967. TIROS 9 was the first satellite in the TIROS series to be placed in a near-polar orbit, thereby increasing TV coverage to the entire daylight portion of the Earth.

References

External links
 Real Time Satellite Tracking - TIROS 9. N2yo.com
 Technical Summary of Polar Meteorological Satellites. pdf

Weather satellites of the United States
Spacecraft launched in 1965